The Chorus Kid is a lost 1928 silent film comedy drama directed by Howard Bretherton and starring Virginia Brown Faire and Bryant Washburn. It was produced and released by independentsts Gotham Productions and Lumas Film respectively.

Cast
Virginia Brown Faire as Beatrice Brown
Bryant Washburn as John Powell
Thelma Hill as Peggy Powell
Hedda Hopper as Mrs. Garrett
John Batten as Jimmy Garrett
Tom O'Brien as Bill Whipple
Sheldon Lewis as Jacob Feldman

References

External links
The Chorus Kid at IMDb.com

1928 films
American silent feature films
Lost American films
Films directed by Howard Bretherton
American black-and-white films
1928 comedy-drama films
1920s English-language films
1928 lost films
Lost comedy-drama films
1920s American films
Silent American comedy-drama films